Montloana Warren Masemola (born 18 May 1983) is a South African actor popularly known for portraying Lentswe Mokethi on the soap opera Scandal!.

Life and  career

Early life and education

Montloana Warren Masemola
born  May 18, 1983, in Garankuwa, Gauteng. Masemola relocated to Soshanguve, where he was raised. He completed his matric in 2000 at Tshwane Christian School, then headed to Newton, Johannesburg, for dancing. He was enrolled at Moving into Dance, an art school, where he studied for a year before studying drama at the Market Theatre Laboratory, graduating in 2004 after 2 years of study.

2008:Acting career beginnings
In 2008, Masemola joined the e.tv soap opera Scandal!, where he played Lentswe Mokethi, an art director. He then starred as Thokozani "Thoko" Chanel on the SABC 1 sitcom Ses'Top La. In 2010, he played the role of Tizozo on SABC 1's Intersexions, a drama series. He has also starred in other popular TV shows such as 90 Plein Street, The Republic, Ayeye, Heist, Ring of Lies, Saints and Sinners, The River, Tjovitjo, Vaya, and Single Galz & Single Guyz. Warren Masemola is now at HOZ (House Of Zwide) fasion e.tv soap which he started to make his first appearance in September 2022, playing the character of the famous glamouras Alex Khadzi who is on a huge battle fasion field with Funani Zwide.

Awards and nominations

References

External links

South African male soap opera actors
1983 births
Living people
People from Ga-Rankuwa